North of the Border in Canada (also released as Collages) is an album by the Ron Collier Orchestra performing music by Canadian composers, with American pianist Duke Ellington as the featured soloist, which was recorded in Toronto in 1967 and released on Decca label.

Reception

The Allmusic review by Scott Yanow stated: "None of the complex suitelike originals are particularly memorable, and the arrangements for the orchestra (two of the pieces utilize a string section) are reasonably colorful, but not too distinctive. Purely for Duke Ellington completists".

Track listing
All compositions by Ron Collier except where noted:
 "Aurora Borealis" – 10:13
 "Nameless Hour" (Norman Symonds) – 8:26
 "Collage #3" (Gordon Delamont) – 2:47
 "Fair Wind" (Symonds) – 3:35
 "Silent Night, Lonely Night" – 2:57
 "Song and Dance" (Delamont) – 9:27

Personnel
Duke Ellington – piano 
The Ron Collier Orchestra: 
Dick Van Evera (track 1), Eric Traugott (tracks 1 & 3-6) – trumpet 
Guido Basso – trumpet, flugelhorn (tracks 1 & 3-6)
Fred Stone – flugelhorn (tracks 1 & 3-6)
Ray Sikora, Butch Watanabe - trombone (tracks 1 & 3-6)
Ron Hughes – bass trombone (tracks 1 & 3-6)
Mary Barrow - French horn (track 1)
Moe Koffman – alto saxophone, flute (track 1)
Bernard Piltch – clarinet, alto saxophone, flute (tracks 1 & 3-6)
Eugene Amaro, Rick Wilkins – tenor saxophone (track 1) 
Gary Morgan – baritone saxophone, bass clarinet (tracks 1 & 3-6)
Ed Bickert – guitar (tracks 1 & 3-6)
Lenny Boyd, Sam Levine (track 2) – bass
Jerry Fuller – drums (tracks 1 & 3-6)
Peter Appleyard – percussion, vibraphone (track 1)
Andrew Benac, Berul Sugarman, Bill Richards, David Zafer, Harold Sumberg, John Dembeck, Joseph Zera, Samuel Hersenhoren – violin (tracks 1 & 2)
Jack Neilson (tracks 1 & 2), Stanley Soloman (tracks 1 & 2), Robert Warburton (track 2) – viola (tracks 1 & 2)
George Horvath (track 2), C. G. Ysselstein (tracks 1 & 2), Don Whitton (tracks 1 & 2) – cello

References

1969 albums
Decca Records albums
Duke Ellington albums
MPS Records albums